Servius Sulpicius Praetextatus was a Roman aristocrat of the Roman Republic who served four times as consular tribune, in 377 BC, 376, 370, and 368. He married the elder daughter of Marcus Fabius Ambustus. An anecdote frequently told said that his wife's sister, the younger daughter of Fabius, who was married to the plebeian Gaius Licinius Stolo, urged on her husband to procure the consulship for plebeians through the Lex Licinia Sextia, as she was jealous of the honors of her sister's husband. As early as the turn of the 19th century, the German historian Barthold Georg Niebuhr pointed out the historical untrustworthiness and contradictions in this tale.

References

4th-century BC Romans
Praetextatus, Servius Sulpicius
Roman consular tribunes